Samuel Pomajevich (born October 12, 1998) is an American swimmer. He earned two silver medals in the 200-meter butterfly and 4×200-meter freestyle relay at the 2019 Pan American Games in Lima, Peru.

References

External links 
 

Living people
1998 births
American male butterfly swimmers
American male freestyle swimmers
Pan American Games silver medalists for the United States
Pan American Games medalists in swimming
Medalists at the 2019 Pan American Games
Swimmers at the 2019 Pan American Games
Sportspeople from Arlington County, Virginia
Texas Longhorns men's swimmers
Swimmers from Virginia